The feminine name Jutta (pronounced "yutta") is the German form of Judith. There is also an alternative theory that it could be derived from the Germanic name Eutha, meaning "mankind, child, descendant", or from a short form of Henrietta.

People
 Jutta Abromeit
 Jutta Allmendinger
 Jutta Appelt
 Jutta Balster
 Jutta Bauer
 Jutta Behrendt
 Jutta Bojsen-Møller
 Jutta Bornemann
 Jutta Braband
 Jutta Brückner
 Jutta Burggraf (1952-2010), German Catholic theologian
 Jutta Deutschland
 Jutta Ditfurth (born 1951), German sociologist 
 Jutta Freybe
 Jutta Gebert
 Jutta Götzmann (born 1965), German art historian
 Jutta Haug (born 1951), German politician
 Jutta Heine
 Jutta Hempel
 Jutta Hering
 Jutta Hering-Winckler
 Jutta Hipp (1925-2003), German-American jazz pianist and composer
 Jutta Hoffmann (born 1941), German actress
 Jutta Höhne
 Jutta Irmscher
 Jutta Jokiranta
 Jutta Jol
 Jutta Kirst
 Jutta Kleinschmidt
 Jutta Koether (born 1958), German artist, musician and critic 
 Jutta Krüger
 Jutta Kulmsee
 Jutta Kunz
 Jutta Lampe
 Jutta Langenau
 Jutta Lau (born 1955), German rower
 Jutta Leerdam (born 1998), Dutch speed skater
 Jutta Lehtinen
 Jutta Limbach
 Jutta Meischner
 Jutta Müller
 Jutta Nardenbach (1968 – 2018), German international footballer
 Jutta Niehaus
 Jutta Oesterle-Schwerin
 Jutta of Bohemia
 Jutta of Denmark
 Jutta of Saxony (c. 1223 – before 2 February 1267), Danish Queen consort
 Jutta of Thuringia
 Jutta Oltersdorf
 Jutta Ploch (born 1960), East German rower
 Jutta Poikolainen
 Jutta Rabe
 Jutta Resch-Treuwerth
 Jutta Richter
 Jutta Rüdiger
 Jutta Seppinen
 Jutta Sika (1877–1964), Austrian graphic designer and artist
 Jutta Speidel (born 1954), German actress
 Jutta Steinruck
 Jutta Steinruck (born 1962), German politician
 Jutta Stienen
 Jutta Stöck
 Jutta Treviranus
 Jutta Urpilainen
 Jutta Vialon
 Duchess Jutta of Mecklenburg-Strelitz (1880-1946), Crown Princess of Montenegro
 Jutta von Sponheim (1091 – 1136), noblewoman
 Jutta Wachowiak
 Jutta Wanke
 Jutta Weber (born 1954), German swimmer
 Jutta Zilliacus

Notes

Further reading 
 Silvas, Anna. Jutta and Hildegard: The Biographical Sources. University Park, PA: The Pennsylvania State University Press, 1998.

German feminine given names